Bruno Correia (born 16 November 1977) is a former Portuguese racing driver. He is currently the safety car driver for both World Touring Car Championship and FIA Formula E and shares duties with Karl Reindler as the Medical Car driver for Formula One.

After a career in karting Correia started his autoracing career in 1994 in his domestic Formula Ford championship. Correia competed in the Formula Ford 1600 class. The Portuguese driver won the title in the last season the class was contested. The following season Correia moved into the Spanish Formula Renault Championship. The Portuguese driver won the Junior championship in 1995 and the overall championship in 1996. For 1997 Correia moved to the United States of America to race in the Skip Barber Formula Dodge. He also competed in Barber Dodge Pro Series races. After not being able to secure a drive for 1998 Correia built a successful hotel at the beach in Cumbuco, Brazil.

Correia returned to the racing circuits in 2005 for a single season. He achieved the runner up position in the Brazilian Supertouring Championship. After working as a driver trainer for several years Correia was appointed as the official WTCC safety car driver. After the 2009 FIA WTCC Race of France in which racing driver Franz Engstler hit the inexperienced safety car drivers (employed by the French ASN, rather than the FIA) the FIA decide to employ a permanent safety car driver. After his first test race weekend at Brno Circuit, Correia was appointed as the safety car driver for the WTCC and its support classes.

For 2012 Correia also joined the European Touring Car Cup as the official safety car driver. For 2014 the Portuguese driver was appointed as the official safety car driver for the inaugural FIA Formula E championship. He drove the electric powered BMW i8 at every event.
On 7 October 2021 it was announced that  Correia would serve as the Formula One medical car driver at the 2021 Turkish Grand Prix standing in for Alan van der Merwe who failed at COVID-19 test prior to that event.

Gallery

References

1977 births
Portuguese racing drivers
Formula Renault drivers
Formula Ford drivers
Barber Pro Series drivers

Formula E people
Living people